Sadikhanr Diar is a village in the Jalangi CD block in the Domkal subdivision of Murshidabad district in the state of West Bengal, India.

Geography

Location

Villages at Sadikhanderah gram panchayat are: Arazi Sadipur, Bara Bil Raghunathpur, Bilaspur Nachharerpara, Damas Bil, Harishankarpur, Paranpur, Paschim, Mehedipara, Sahebrampur, Raghunathpur, Sadikhar Diar and Sadipur.

Area overview
While the Lalbag subdivision is spread across both the natural physiographic regions of the district, Rarh and Bagri, the Domkal subdivision occupies the north-eastern corner of Bagri. In the map alongside, the Ganges/ Padma River flows along the northern portion. The border with Bangladesh can be seen in the north and the east. Murshidabad district shares with Bangladesh a porous international border which is notoriously crime prone (partly shown in this map).The Ganges has a tendency to change course frequently, causing severe erosion, mostly along the southern bank. The city of Murshidabad, a centre of major tourist attraction, is located in this area. In 1717, when Murshid Quli Khan became Subahdar, he made Murshidabad the capital of Subah Bangla (then Bengal, Bihar and Odisha). The entire area is overwhelmingly rural with over 90% of the population living in the rural areas.

Note: The map alongside presents some of the notable locations in the subdivisions. All places marked in the map are linked in the larger full screen map.

Demographics
According to the 2011 Census of India, Sadikhanr Diar had a total population of 4,531, of which 2,284 (50%) were males and 2,247 (50%) were females. Population in the age range 0-6 years was 521. The total number of literate persons in Sadikhanr Diar was 2,922 (72.87% of the population over 6 years).

Transport
State Highway 11, running from Mahammad Bazar (in Birbhum district) to Ranaghat (in Nadia district) passes through Sadikhanr Diar. This section is locally popular as Berhampore-Jalangi Road.

Education
Murshidabad Minority B.Ed College situated at Sadikhanr Diar. It is affiliated to the University of Kalyani, offers a course in B Ed.

Healthcare
Sadikhanr Diar Rural Hospital at Sadikhanr Diar functions with 30 beds.

References

Villages in Murshidabad district